Animal Hospital is a British television show starring Australian singer and TV presenter Rolf Harris that ran on BBC One from 1994 to 2004 and more recently starring Phil Dixon. The series featured animal welfare stories from many RSPCA hospitals, including: Harmsworth Animal Hospital in North London.

Locations
Harmsworth Animal Hospital in North London was the first of three RSPCA hospitals that opened their doors to allow the BBC to produce this factual television show which ran for over a decade. The programmes were presented by Rolf Harris. After Harmsworth, the series moved to the Putney Animal Hospital in South London, and then to Salford Animal Hospital in Greater Manchester.

In 2015, the RSPCA announced that the animal hospital in Putney, South London would be closed. The animal hospitals at Sonderburg Road in Islington, North London, and Eccles New Road, Salford, Greater Manchester remain open.

Australian version
The Australian version of Animal Hospital on the Nine Network between 1996 and 2001. Like Easy Eats, the show's highlights dubbed as episodes edited in Animal Tales, an hour show dedicated to animal welfare stories. It was broadcast on the Nine Network since 2019.

References

External links

BBC Television shows
1994 British television series debuts
2004 British television series endings
Television series about animals
English-language television shows